The James Morrow House is a historic farmhouse in Newark, Delaware. It was built in the late 1860s by James Morrow, an Irish immigrant who owned a store in Wilmington. The building is locally significant for its unusual architecture, which features both a gambrel roof and a raised basement. It was listed on the National Register of Historic Places in 1983.

The house has one and a half stories on top of a partially above-ground basement. The facade is symmetrical, with two bays on either side of a flat-roofed porch. The exterior walls are stuccoed with green trim and large sash windows. The house has an asphalt-shingled gambrel roof with bracketed cornices and three gable dormer windows on each side. The house is built from stone and weighs just under 500 tons.

The Morrow House originally stood along with a number of outbuildings on a 24-acre parcel of farmland. The owners of the building planned to renovate it and convert it into office space; however as of 2012 the house remains vacant.

References

Houses on the National Register of Historic Places in Delaware
Houses in Newark, Delaware
Irish-American culture in Delaware
National Register of Historic Places in New Castle County, Delaware